Koljić is a Bosnian surname. Notable people include:

 Alem Koljić (born 1999), German and Bosnian-Herzegovinian footballer
 Elvir Koljić (born 1995), Bosnian footballer

Bosnian surnames
Slavic-language surnames
Patronymic surnames